This is a list of schools in the East Riding of Yorkshire, England.

State-funded schools

Primary schools 

Acre Heads Primary School, Anlaby Common
Airmyn Park Primary School, Airmyn
Aldbrough Primary School, Aldbrough
All Saints CE Infant Academy, Hessle
All Saints CE Junior Academy, Hessle
Anlaby Primary School, Anlaby
Bacon Garth Primary School, Cottingham
Barmby Moor CE Primary School, Barmby Moor
Barmby-on-the-Marsh Primary School, Barmby on the Marsh
Bay Primary School, Bridlington
Beeford CE Primary School, Beeford
Bempton Primary School, Bempton
Beswick and Watton CE Primary School, Beswick
Beverley Minster CE Primary School, Beverley
Beverley St Nicholas Community Primary School, Beverley
Bilton Community Primary School, Bilton
Bishop Wilton CE Primary School, Bishop Wilton
Boothferry Primary School, Boothferry
Boynton Primary School, Boynton
Brandesburton Primary School, Brandesburton
Brough Primary School, Brough
Bubwith Community Primary School, Bubwith
Bugthorpe CE Primary School, Bugthorpe
Burlington Infant School, Bridlington
Burlington Junior School, Bridlington
Burstwick Community Primary School, Burstwick
Burton Agnes CE Primary School, Burton Agnes
Burton Pidsea Primary School, Burton Pidsea
Cherry Burton CE Primary School, Cherry Burton
Cowick CE Primary School, East Cowick
Croxby Primary School, Cottingham
Driffield CE Infant School, Driffield
Driffield Junior School, Driffield
Dunswell Primary School, Dunswell
Eastrington Primary School, Eastrington
Elloughton Primary School, Elloughton
Flamborough CE Primary School, Flamborough
Garton-on-the-Wolds CE Primary School, Garton on the Wolds
Gilberdyke Primary School, Gilberdyke
Hallgate Primary School, Cottingham
Hedon Primary School, Hedon
Hessle Penshurst Primary School, Hessle
Hilderthorpe Primary School, Bridlington
Holme-upon-Spalding Moor Primary School, Holme-on-Spalding-Moor
Hook CE Primary School, Hook
Hornsea Burton Primary School, Hornsea
Hornsea Community Primary School, Hornsea
Howden CE Infant School, Howden
Howden Junior School, Howden
Hunsley Primary, Brough
Hutton Cranswick Community Primary School, Hutton Cranswick
Inmans Primary School, Hedon
Keldmarsh Primary School, Beverley
Keyingham Primary School, Keyingham
Kilham CE Primary School, Kilham
Kingsway Primary School, Goole
Kirk Ella St Andrew's Community Primary School, Kirk Ella
Leconfield Primary School, Leconfield
Leven CE Primary School, Leven
Little Weighton Rowley CE Primary School, Little Weighton
Lockington CE Primary School, Lockington
Market Weighton Infant School, Market Weighton
Marshlands Primary School, Goole
Martongate Primary School, Bridlington
Melbourne Community Primary School, Melbourne
Middleton-on-the-Wolds CE Primary School, Middleton on the Wolds
Molescroft Primary School, Molescroft
Mount Pleasant CE Junior School, Market Weighton
Nafferton Primary School, Nafferton
New Pasture Lane Primary School, Bridlington
Newbald Primary School, North Newbald
Newport Primary School, Newport
North Cave CE Primary School, North Cave
North Ferriby CE Primary School, North Ferriby
North Frodingham Primary School, North Frodingham
Northfield Infant School, Driffield
Our Lady and St Peter RC Primary School, Bridlington
Parkside Primary School, Goole
Patrington CE Primary Academy, Patrington
Paull Primary School, Paull
Pocklington CE Infant School, Pocklington
Pocklington Junior School, Pocklington
Pollington-Balne CE Primary School, Pollington
Preston Primary School, Preston
Quay Academy, Bridlington
Rawcliffe Bridge Primary School, Rawcliffe Bridge
Rawcliffe Primary School, Rawcliffe
Reedness Primary School, Reedness
Riston CE Primary Academy, Long Riston
Roos CE Primary School, Roos
St John of Beverley RC Primary School, Beverley
St Joseph's RC Primary School, Goole
St Martin's CE Primary School, Fangfoss
St Mary and St Joseph RC Primary School, Pocklington
St Mary's CE Primary School, Beverley
St Mary's RC Primary School, Market Weighton
Sigglesthorne CE Primary Academy, Sigglesthorne
Skidby CE Primary School, Skidby
Skipsea Primary School, Skipsea
Skirlaugh CE Primary School, Skirlaugh
Sledmere CE Primary School, Sledmere
Snaith Primary School, Snaith
South Cave CE Primary School, South Cave
Springhead Primary School, Anlaby
Sproatley Endowed CE Academy, Sproatley
Stamford Bridge Primary School, Stamford Bridge
Sutton upon Derwent CE Primary School, Sutton upon Derwent
Swanland Primary School, Swanland
Swinefleet Primary School, Swinefleet
Swinemoor Primary School, Beverley
Thorngumbald Primary School, Thorngumbald
Tickton Primary School, Tickton
Walkington Primary School, Walkington
Warter CE Primary School, Warter
Wawne Primary School, Wawne
Welton Primary School, Welton
Westfield Primary School, Cottingham
Wetwang CE Primary School, Wetwang
Wilberfoss CE Primary School, Wilberfoss
Willerby Carr Lane Primary School, Willerby
Withernsea Primary School, Withernsea
Wold Newton Foundation School, Wold Newton
Woodmansey CE Primary School, Woodmansey

Secondary schools 

Beverley Grammar School, Beverley
Beverley High School, Beverley
Bridlington School, Bridlington
Cottingham High School, Cottingham
Driffield School, Driffield
Goole Academy, Goole
Headlands School, Bridlington
Hessle High School, Hessle
Holderness Academy, Preston
Hornsea School and Language College, Hornsea
Howden School, Howden
Longcroft School, Beverley
The Market Weighton School, Market Weighton
The Snaith School, Snaith
South Hunsley School, Melton
Withernsea High School, Withernsea
Woldgate School and Sixth Form College, Pocklington
Wolfreton School, Willerby

Special and alternative schools 
The Hub School, Anlaby Common
Kings Mill School, Driffield
Riverside Special School, Goole
St Anne's School, Welton

Further education 
Bishop Burton College, Beverley
East Riding College, Beverley

Independent schools

Primary and preparatory schools
Hessle Mount School, Hessle

Senior and all-through schools
Pocklington School, Pocklington
Tranby School, Anlaby

Special and alternative schools
The Becklands, Market Weighton
Cambian Beverley School, Beverley
Horton House School, Wawne
Sycamore House School, Withernsea

References

East Riding of Yorkshire
Schools in the East Riding of Yorkshire
Lists of buildings and structures in the East Riding of Yorkshire